The Western Indiana Small High School Conference was a short-lived IHSAA-sanctioned conference that was formed in 1957. The conference was made up of high schools with less than 100 students in Benton and White counties. The conference only lasted four years, as all but one of the schools consolidated into larger schools.

Former members

References

Indiana high school athletic conferences
High school sports conferences and leagues in the United States
Indiana High School Athletic Association disestablished conferences
1957 establishments in Indiana